The three urban cities Kazipet, Hanamkonda and Warangal are together known as Warangal Tri-City. The three cities are connected by National Highway 163. The major stations are Kazipet Junction railway station and Warangal railway station.

References 

Cities and towns in Telangana